The national symbols of the Kurds is a list of flags, icons or cultural expressions that are emblematic, representative or otherwise characteristic of the Kurdish people.

Flags

Coats of arms

Anthems 
"Hey Enemy" (Ey Reqîb), national anthem of the Kurdistan Regional Government.
"Oh Homeland" (Ey Niştîman),

Founders 
 Selahedînê Eyûbî
 Sharaf Khan
 Sheikh Ubeydullah
 Simko Shikak
 Mahmud Barzanji
 Ibrahim Haski
 Ihsan Nuri Pasha
 Qazi Muhammad
 Mustafa Barzani
 Abdullah Öcalan
 Mazlum Doğan
 Mazlum Kobanê
 Cemîl Bayik
 Murat Karayılan
 Jalal Talabani
 Salih Muslim

Myths 

 Sīmir, mythological figure, found in Kurdish folklore.
 Kawa the Blacksmith, mythological figure, found in Kurdish folklore.
 Rûsem, mythological figure, found in Kurdish Shahnameh.
 Felamerz, a figure in Kurdish Shahnameh
 Sam, a figure in Kurdish Shahnameh
 Zenûn, a figure in Kurdish Shahnameh

Poets 

 Mela Hesenê Bateyî
 Melayê Cizîrî
 Faqi Tayran
 Ahmad Khani
 Almas Khan-e Kanoule'ei
 Khana Qubadi

Animals 
 Asiatic Lion (Lion of Judah/Lion of Babylon, a common Symbol in Mesopotamia)
 Eastern imperial eagle (Eagle of Saladin, aprimary national symbol)
 Shahbaz (means "royal falcon", a fabled bird in Kurdish mythology and also a religious symbol in Yarsanism)
 Chukar partridge (primary cultural symbol)
 Peafowl (religious)
Capra (genus), a religious symbol in Yarsanism
 Van cat (regional)
 Rooster, a religious symbol in Yarsanism
 Fish, a religious symbol in Yarsanism
 Wild boar, a religious symbol in Yarsanism

Trees 
 Oak
 Quercus cerris (Usually as unique)
 Pomegranate tree
 The Shirin and Farhad Tree, a local symbole of Kermanshah
 Palm tree, a local symbole of Qasr-e Shirin, Khanaqin and Kirkuk

Books 

 Saranjâm, Holy book of Yarsanism which contains oldest parts of Kurdish literature
 Kurdish Shahnameh
 The Book of Honor (Sharafnama)
 Ancestry of the Kurds
 Mam and Zin
 The Promise of the Black Horse

Mountains 

 Qandil
 Kurmênc
 Zagros
Sinjar Mountains

Dishes 

 Kelane (bread)
 Dolma (Yaprax)

Other symbols 
 Sun
 Newroz / نه‌ورۆز
 Geliyê Elî Beg / گەلیی عەلی بەگ

See also 

 Kurds
 National symbols of Iran
 National symbols of Azerbaijan

References

National symbols
Kurdish culture